The 1919 Dartmouth football team was an American football team that represented Dartmouth College as an independent during the 1919 college football season. In its third season under head coach Clarence Spears, the team compiled a 6–1–1 record and outscored opponents by a total of 141 to 53. Jackson Cannell was the team captain.

Schedule

References

Dartmouth
Dartmouth Big Green football seasons
Dartmouth football